DYFX-TV, Channel 49, is a television station of Philippine television network Net 25, owned by Eagle Broadcasting Corporation. Its transmitter facilities is located at Brgy. San Roque, Cebu South Coastal Road, Talisay City (just within the Metro Cebu area). The station is currently planning to expand its programming in the near future.

See also
DZEC-TV
Eagle Broadcasting Corporation
DYFX Radyo Agila 1305 Cebu

Television channels and stations established in 1999
Television stations in Cebu City
1999 establishments in the Philippines